Pilgersdorf is a town in the district of Oberpullendorf in the Austrian state of Burgenland.

Geography 
The town is located in Middle Burgenland in the Zöbern valley, between Kirchschlag in der Buckligen Welt and Lockenhaus. It is the amalgamation of the communities of Bubendorf, Deutsch Gerisdorf, Kogl, Lebenbrunn, Pilgersdorf, Salmannsdorf and Steinbach.

Population

References

External links

Cities and towns in Oberpullendorf District